Philippine Medal of Valor may refer to:
Armed Forces of the Philippines Medal of Valor, the highest military decoration of the Philippines
Philippine National Police Medal of Valor, the highest police decoration of the Philippines

See also
Medal of Valor